William Richard Brinsley  (9 March 1887 – 21 January 1959) was a New Zealand cricketer, manufacturer and sports administrator. He played two first-class matches for Otago in 1917/18.

Brinsley attended Otago Boys' High School in Dunedin, and later was one of the founders and the first captain of the Old Boys Cricket Club in Dunedin senior cricket. He became a prominent sports administrator in Dunedin. Among the offices he held, he was president of the Otago Cricket Association, president of the Otago Lawn Tennis Association, and president of the Dunedin Badminton Club. He was appointed a Member of the Order of the British Empire in the 1957 Queen's Birthday Honours, for services to the community in the field of sport.

Brinsley was the managing director of Radiation (N.Z.) Ltd, manufacturers of coal and gas cooking ranges.

References

External links
 

1887 births
1959 deaths
People educated at Otago Boys' High School
New Zealand cricketers
Otago cricketers
Cricketers from Dunedin
New Zealand cricket administrators
New Zealand Members of the Order of the British Empire
New Zealand businesspeople